The Portuguese Rugby League Association is the governing body for the sport of rugby league football in Portugal. The Association was formed in 2005.

See also

 Rugby league in Portugal
 Portugal national rugby league team

References

External links

Rugby league governing bodies in Europe
Rugby League
Sports organizations established in 2005
2005 establishments in Portugal